The Portugal men's national basketball team represents Portugal in international basketball competition. The team is controlled by the Portuguese Basketball Federation.

Portugal doesn't have much history on the international stage, although they have qualified for the EuroBasket three times (1951, 2007, 2011).
While Portugal has made multiple appearances at the continental level, they continue their quest to qualify for the global stage at the FIBA World Cup.

History

Early years
The Portuguese Basketball Federation was founded in 1927, with the national team playing in their first match on 24 May 1931, a 9–32 defeat to France. Portugal would become a co-founder of FIBA in 1932. Three years later, in 1935, Portugal played in the only qualifying game for the first European Basketball Championship. The Portuguese lost the game 33–12 against Spain, which eliminated the team from qualification.

EuroBasket 1951
After Portugal's failed attempt to qualify for the European Championship in 1935, and declining to enter the competition multiple times thereafter, Portugal made their debut at the Euros for EuroBasket 1951 in Paris. The national team got off to a lethargic start to begin the tournament, as they lost 35–81 in their first ever match in the event to Greece. In Portugal's final two games of the preliminary round, the team would fall once again to Bulgaria, but would pick up their first official victory in the competition with a walkover win after Romania withdrew. With a record of (1–2), and sitting in third place in the group, Portugal could not progress any further; and was relegated to the classification rounds. In the classification phase, Portugal lost its first two matches against West Germany and Austria, but would pullout a close win over Switzerland 49–52. Finishing with a duplicate record of (1–2) once again, Portugal was sent to the classification play-offs to determine 13th–16th place. The national team would go on to lose their match to Denmark, before turning around to defeat Scotland, to end the event placing 15th overall out of the 18 teams.

EuroBasket 2007
At the conclusion of Portugal's first appearance at the European Championship in 1951, the national team would fail to make it back to the competition for the next five decades. However, Portugal would end their drought when they made their second appearance on the continental stage at EuroBasket 2007 (first time through qualification) by finishing first in their group during the qualifiers.

Entering the preliminary round, Portugal's first match of the tournament came against the hosts Spain, where the team suffered a heavy defeat 56–82. After dropping their second game of the competition to Croatia, Portugal earned a crucial victory in their final preliminary phase match against Latvia 77–67. The important win over Latvia ultimately was enough to propel the team into the second round of the tournament for the first time.

Portugal began the second round with a loss against Russia, who eventually went on to become champions of the competition; before picking up a solid victory in their second game of the round versus Israel 94–85. Although with an opportunity to advance to the quarter-finals all but gone, Portugal would easily be defeated by Greece 85–67 in their final game of the event. Nevertheless, the performance displayed by Portugal throughout the tournament was their best showing at the Euros ever to that point; which ensured the national team a top ten finish.

EuroBasket 2011
After missing out on qualification for the EuroBasket in 2009, Portugal was successful during the qualifiers for EuroBasket 2011. Portugal was placed into Group A to begin the tournament, where they would meet Turkey in their first match. However, the team was outplayed from start to finish, in a 79–56 loss. At a record of (0–1), Portugal's task of winning their next match would be even tougher, with a date against Spain. Even with a valiant effort put up by the national team, Spain were just too much to overcome in the 73–87 defeat. For Portugal's final three group stage matches, the team was unable to put together an efficient stretch of basketball for a full game; which resulted in three more losses to prevent the team from advancing.

EuroBasket 2017 qualification
In the attempt for Portugal to reach the European Championship once again, after failed opportunities to qualify in 2013 and 2015; the national team was placed into Group D during the qualifying process. However, Portugal struggled in their first five matches in the qualifiers (0–5), to come away with their only win against Belarus 77–62 before being eliminated.

2019 World Cup qualification
During qualification for Portugal to advance toward making their first appearance in the FIBA World Cup, the team first had to make it through European Pre-Qualifiers in order to realize their chance. Unfortunately, the national team was unable to improve on their performance they would display during qualifying for the prior EuroBasket, and would fail to progress further with a record of (1–3).

2020s–present
After Portugal's failure to qualify for the EuroBasket on multiple occasions after their last appearance in 2011, the team began the procedure to try to qualify for EuroBasket 2022. Portugal began their journey with the Pre-Qualifiers, being drawn into Group C for the first round. In their opening game, the team would lose in a narrow contest to Cyprus, before defeating Luxembourg. With two games left to go in the first round, Portugal put away Cyprus in the rematch before cruising past Luxembourg once again to advance into the second phase of pre-qualifiers at (3–1). In the second round, however, Portugal's fortunes would completely be reversed as the team went (1–3) in this phase to need the third and final round to determine their fate. There, Portugal would only manage to achieve slightly better results at (2–2), but still finished at the bottom of their group again to be eliminated.

Competitive record

FIBA World Cup

Olympic Games

Lusofonia Games

EuroBasket

Results and fixtures

2021

2022

2023

Team

Current roster
Roster for the EuroBasket 2025 Pre-Qualifiers matches on 23 and 26 February 2023 against Cyprus and Bulgaria.

Depth chart

Head coach position

Notable players

Past rosters
1951 EuroBasket: finished 15th among 18 teams

3 Mário Almeida, 4 Bernardo Leite, 5 Rui Duarte, 6 Avelino Carmo, 7 Máximo Couto, 8 Lenine Santos, 9 José Oliveira, 10 Antonio Cardoso, 11 César Cardoso, 12 Domingos Diogo, 14 José Almeida, 15 João Coutinho (Coach: Fernando Amaral)

2007 EuroBasket: finished 9th among 16 teams

4 Miguel Minhava, 5 Mário Gil Fernandes, 6 Sérgio Ramos, 7 Paulo Cunha, 8 Francisco Jordão, 9 Filipe da Silva, 10 João Gomes, 11 Jorge Coelho, 12 Paulo Simão, 13 Elvis Évora, 14 Miguel Miranda 15 João Santos (Coach: Valentin Melnychuk)

2011 EuroBasket: finished 21st among 24 teams

4 António Tavares, 5 José Costa, 6 Miguel Minhava, 7 Fernando Sousa, 8 Cláudio Fonseca, 9 Filipe da Silva, 10 Carlos Andrade, 11 José Silva, 12 Elvis Évora, 13 Marco Goncalves, 14 Miguel Miranda, 15 João Santos (Coach: Mário Palma)

Kit

Manufacturer
2012: Reebok
2020–present: Dhika

Sponsor
2012: Montepio

See also

Sport in Portugal
Portugal women's national basketball team
Portugal men's national under-20 basketball team
Portugal men's national under-18 basketball team
Portugal men's national under-16 basketball team

Notes

References

External links

Official website 
Portugal FIBA profile
Portugal National Team – Men at Eurobasket.com
Portugal Basketball Records at FIBA Archive

Videos
Portugal v Sweden – Full Game – 2023 FIBA World Cup European Pre-Qualifiers Youtube.com video

 
1932 establishments in Portugal